The Netherlands Football League Championship 1899–1900 was contested by thirteen teams participating in two divisions. The national champion would be determined by a play-off featuring the winners of the eastern and western football division of the Netherlands. HVV Den Haag won this year's championship by beating Victoria Wageningen 1–0 in a decision match.

New entrants
Eerste Klasse East:
Hercules
Victoria Wageningen

Eerste Klasse West:
Ajax Sportman Combinatie (also known as Ajax Leiden)

Divisions

Eerste Klasse East

Eerste Klasse West

Championship play-off

Replay

HVV Den Haag won the championship.

References
RSSSF Netherlands Football League Championships 1898-1954
RSSSF Eerste Klasse Oost
RSSSF Eerste Klasse West

Netherlands Football League Championship seasons
1899 in Dutch sport
1900 in Dutch sport